A kapo or prisoner functionary was a prisoner in a Nazi camp who was assigned by the Schutzstaffel (SS) guards to supervise forced labor or carry out administrative tasks.

Also called "prisoner self-administration", the prisoner functionary system minimized costs by allowing camps to function with fewer SS personnel. The system was designed to turn victim against victim, as the prisoner functionaries were pitted against their fellow prisoners in order to maintain the favor of their SS overseers. If they neglected their duties, they would be demoted to ordinary prisoners and be subject to other kapos. Many prisoner functionaries were recruited from the ranks of violent criminal gangs rather than from the more numerous political, religious, and racial prisoners; such criminal convicts were known for their brutality toward other prisoners. This brutality was tolerated by the SS and was an integral part of the camp system.

Prisoner functionaries were spared physical abuse and hard labor, provided they performed their duties to the satisfaction of the SS functionaries. They also had access to certain privileges, such as civilian clothes and a private room. While the Germans commonly called them kapos, the official government term for prisoner functionaries was Funktionshäftling.

After World War II, the term was reused as an insult; according to The Jewish Chronicle, it is "the worst insult a Jew can give another Jew".

Etymology
The word "kapo" could have come from the Italian word for "head" and "boss", . According to the Duden, it is derived from the French word for "Corporal". Journalist Robert D. McFadden believes that the word "kapo" is derived from the German word , meaning camp captain.

System of thrift and manipulation
Camps were controlled by the SS, but day-to-day organization was supplemented by the system of functionary prisoners, a second hierarchy that made it easier for the Nazis to control the camps. These prisoners made it possible for the camps to function with fewer SS personnel. The prisoner functionaries sometimes numbered as high as 10% of the inmates. The Nazis were able to keep the number of paid staff who had direct contact with the prisoners very low in comparison to normal prisons today. Without the functionary prisoners, the SS camp administrations would not have been able to keep the day-to-day operations of the camps running smoothly. The kapos often did this work for extra food, cigarettes, alcohol or other privileges.

At Buchenwald, these tasks were originally assigned to criminal prisoners, but after 1939, political prisoners began to displace the criminal prisoners, though criminals were preferred by the SS. At Mauthausen, on the other hand, functionary positions remained dominated by criminal prisoners until just before liberation. The system and hierarchy also inhibited solidarity among the prisoners. There were tensions between the various nationalities and prisoner groups, who were distinguished by different Nazi concentration camp badges. Jews wore yellow stars; other prisoners wore colored triangles pointed downward.

Prisoner functionaries were often hated by other prisoners and spat upon as Nazi henchmen. While some barrack leaders (Blockälteste) tried to assist the prisoners under their command by secretly helping them get extra food or easier jobs, others were more concerned with their own survival and, to that end, did more to assist the SS.

Identified by green triangles, the Berufsverbrecher or "BV" ("career criminals") kapos, were called "professional criminals" by other prisoners and were known for their brutality and lack of scruples. Indeed, they were selected by the SS because of those qualities. According to former prisoners, criminal functionaries were more apt to be helpful to the SS than political functionaries, who were more apt to be helpful to other prisoners.

From Oliver Lustig's Dictionary of the Camp:

Domination and terror
The SS used domination and terror to control the camps' large populations with just a few SS functionaries. The system of prisoner guards was a "key instrument of domination", and was commonly called "prisoner self-government" (Häftlings-Selbstverwaltung) in SS parlance.

The camp's draconian rules, constant threat of beatings, humiliation, punishment, and the practice of punishing entire groups for the actions of one prisoner were psychological and physical torments added to the starvation and physical exhaustion from back-breaking labor. Prisoner guards were used to push other inmates to work harder, saving the need for paid SS supervision. Many kapos felt caught in the middle, being both victims and perpetrators. Though kapos generally had a bad reputation, many suffered guilt about their actions, both at the time and after the war, as revealed in a book about Jewish kapos.

Many prisoner functionaries, primarily from the ranks of the "greens" or criminal prisoners, could be quite ruthless in order to justify their privileges, especially when an SS man was around. They also played an active role in the beatings, even killing fellow prisoners. Feared and hated, he was known as a sadist and was responsible for several deaths. He was released from Dachau in 1942 and became a member of the Waffen-SS. Some guards were personally involved in the mass murder of other prisoners. Beginning in October 1944, criminal functionaries from among the German Reichsdeutsche were sought out for transfer to the Dirlewanger Brigade.

Ranks of functionary
The important functionary positions inside the camp were Lagerältester (camp leader or camp senior), Blockältester (block or barracks leader or senior), and Stubenältester (room leader). The highest position that a prisoner could reach was Lagerältester, who was placed directly under the camp commandant and expected to implement his orders to ensure that the camp's daily routines ran smoothly and that regulations were followed. The Lagerälteste had a key role in the selection of other prisoners as functionaries, making recommendations to the SS. Though dependent on the goodwill of the SS, through them, he had access to special privileges, such as access to civilian clothes or a private room.

The Blockältester (block or barracks leader) had to ensure that rules were followed in the individual barracks. He or she was also responsible for the prisoners in the barracks. The Stubenälteste (room leader) was responsible for the hygiene, such as delousing, and order of each room in a barracks. The Blockschreiber (registrar or barrack clerk) was a record-keeping job that included tasks such as keeping track at roll calls.

Work crews outside the camp were supervised by a Vorarbeiter (foreman), a Kapo, or Oberkapo (chief kapo). These functionaries pushed their fellow prisoners to work harder, hitting, beating, and even killing them.

Prisoner functionaries could often help other prisoners by getting them into better barracks or assigned to lighter work. On occasion, the functionaries could effect other prisoners' removal from transport lists or even secure new identities in order to protect them from persecution. This assistance was generally limited to the prisoners in the functionary's own group (fellow citizens or political comrades). The prisoner functionaries were in a precarious hierarchy between their fellow inmates and the SS. This situation was intentionally created, as revealed in a speech by Heinrich Himmler.

In National Socialism's racial ideology, some races were "superior" and others "inferior". Similarly, the SS sometimes had racial criteria for the prisoner functionaries; one sometimes had to be racially "superior" to be a functionary. The group category was also sometimes a factor. A knowledge of foreign languages was also advantageous, particularly as the international population of the camps increased, and because the SS preferred a certain level of education.

An eager prisoner functionary could have a camp "career" as an SS favorite and be promoted from Kapo to Oberkapo and eventually to Lagerältester, but could also just as easily run afoul of the SS and be sent to the gas chambers.

Prosecution of kapos
During the 1946-47 Stutthof trials in Gdańsk, Poland, in which Stutthof concentration camp personnel were prosecuted, five kapos were found to have used extreme brutality and were sentenced to death. Four of them were executed on 4 July 1946, and one on 10 October 1947. Another was sentenced to three years' imprisonment and one acquitted and released on 29 November 1947.

The Israeli Nazis and Nazi Collaborators (Punishment) Law of 1950, most famously used to prosecute Adolf Eichmann in 1961 and Ivan Demjanjuk in 1986, was originally introduced with the principal aim of prosecuting Jewish people who collaborated with the Nazis. Between 1951 and 1964, approximately 40 trials were held, mostly of people alleged to have been kapos. Fifteen trials are known to have resulted in convictions, but scant details are available since the records were sealed in 1995 for a period of 70 years from the trial date. One person – Yehezkel Jungster – was convicted of crimes against humanity, which carried a mandatory death penalty, but the sentence was commuted to two years in prison. Jungster was pardoned in 1952, but died a few days after his release.

According to teacher and researcher Dan Porat, the way in which former kapos were officially viewed – and tried – by the state of Israel went through four distinct phases. Initially viewed as co-perpetrators of Nazi atrocities, they eventually came to be perceived as victims themselves. 
During the first stage described by Porat (August 1950 – January 1952), those alleged to have served or to have collaborated with the Nazis were placed on an equal footing with their captors, with some measure of leniency appearing only in the sentencing phase for some cases. It was during this phase that Jungster was sentenced to death; six other former kapos were each sentenced to an average of almost five years in prison. 
Jungster’s death sentence had not been anticipated by either the legislators nor the prosecutors, according to Porat, and triggered a number of amendments to pre-trial charges in order to remove any indictment that would potentially carry a death penalty. During this second phase (February 1952 – 1957), the Israeli Supreme Court overturned Jungster’s sentence and essentially ruled that while Nazis could be charged with crimes against humanity and war crimes, their former collaborators could not. While prosecutions of kapos continued, doubts emerged amongst some of those in the public sphere as to whether the trials should continue at all. The official view remained that kapos had been Jewish collaborators, not Nazis themselves. 
By 1958, when the third phase began (lasting until 1962), the legal system had begun to view kapos as having committed wrongs but with good intentions. Thus, only those whom prosecutors believed had aligned themselves with the Nazis' aims were brought to trial. There were calls from some survivors that the trials should end, though other survivors still demanded that justice be served.
The fourth phase (1963 – 1972) was marked by the trial of Adolf Eichmann, one of the principal architects of the Final Solution, and of Hirsch Barenblat two years later. Kapos and collaborators were now seen by the courts as ordinary victims, a complete reversal from the initial official perspective. Eichmann’s prosecutor was very clear in drawing a line between the Jewish collaborators and camp functionaries, and the evil Nazis. 
Barenblat’s trial in 1963 drove this point home. Barenblat, conductor of the Israel National Opera, was tried for having turned Jews over to the Nazis as head of the Jewish police in the Bendzin ghetto in Poland. Having arrived in Israel in 1958–9, Barenblat was arrested after a ghetto survivor recognised him while he was conducting an opera. Found guilty of helping the Nazis by ensuring that Jews selected for the death camps did not escape, Barenblat was sentenced to five years in prison. On 1 May 1964, after having served three months, Barenblat was freed and Israel’s Supreme Court quashed his conviction. The acquittal may have been due to the court’s aim of putting an end to the trials against kapos and other alleged Nazi collaborators.

A small number of kapos were prosecuted in East and West Germany. In a well-publicised 1968 case, two Auschwitz kapos were put on trial in Frankfurt. They were indicted for 189 murders and multiple assaults, found guilty of several murders, and sentenced to life imprisonment.

Significance
German historian Karin Orth wrote that there was hardly a measure so perfidious as the SS attempt to delegate the implementation of terror and violence to the victims themselves. Eugen Kogon, an avowed opponent of Nazism from prewar Germany and a Buchenwald concentration camp survivor, wrote after the war that the concentration camp system owed its stability in no small way to the cadre of kapos, who took over the daily operations of the camp and relieved SS personnel. The absolute power was ubiquitous. The system of discipline and supervision would have promptly disintegrated, according to Kogon, without the delegation of power. The rivalry over supervisory and warehouse functionary jobs was, for the SS, an opportunity to pit prisoners against each other. Regular prisoners were at the mercy of a dual authority: the SS, who often hardly seemed to be at the camp, and the prisoner kapos, who were always there.

The term kapo has been used as a slur in the twenty-first century, particularly for Jews deemed insufficiently supportive of Israel or Zionism. In 2017, David Friedman, soon to become US ambassador to Israel, apologized for referring to supporters of the J Street advocacy group as "far worse than kapos".

See also

 Belsen Trial, the Trial of Joseph Kramer and 44 others (former kapos, convicted in late 1945 for war crimes).
 Bitch Wars in the Soviet Gulag system.
 Divide and rule
 Eliezer Gruenbaum, notable kapo
 Jewish Ghetto Police
 Judenrat - Jewish councils under Nazi administration for self-government in Ghettos and other Jewish communities in occupied territories.
 Line management
 Plantations in the American South#Overseer
 Triangulation (psychology)
 Trusty system (prison)
 Kapo, a 1960 film directed by Gillo Pontecorvo.
 Escape from Sobibor, a 1987 television movie which features a kapo helping prisoners escape from Sobibór extermination camp.
 The Counterfeiters, a film which features several kapos, in various camps.

Footnotes

References

Further reading
Revital Ludewig-Kedmi, Opfer und Täter zugleich? Moraldilemmata jüdischer Funktionshäftlinge in der Shoah. Psyche und Gesellschaft. Book expanded from a doctoral dissertation about the moral dilemma faced by Jewish kapos in the Holocaust. Psychosozial Verlag, Gießen (2001)

External links

Sebastian Dregger: Die Rolle der Funktionshäftlinge im Vernichtungslager Auschwitz – und das Beispiel Otto Küsels. 
Abschnitt aus dem Bericht der Auschwitzflüchtlinge Alfred Wetzler und Rudolf Vrba über F. (Late April 1944) 

Nazi concentration camp occupations
Jewish collaboration with Nazi Germany
Terminology of Nazi concentration camps
Nazi terminology
Holocaust terminology